Sidi Gouicem Mosque, is a Tunisian mosque in the north of the medina of Tunis, in the Bab Souika suburb.

Localization
 The mosque can be found in 39 Naceur Ben Jaafar Street.
 Location of Mosque

Etymology
It got its name from its founder, the cheikh Mohammed Gouicem El Nouaoui.
He was born in 1623 and died in 1702. He used to teach Hadiths in the Sidi Mahrez Mosque.

Description
According to the historian Mohamed Belkhodja, the founder of the mosque is buried there from the 18th century. The tomb has no inscription on it.

References 

Mosques in Tunis
17th-century mosques